Golobinjek ob Sotli is a settlement on the right bank of the Sotla River in the Municipality of Podčetrtek in eastern Slovenia. The area around Podčetrtek is part of the traditional region of Styria. It is now included in the Savinja Statistical Region.

Name
The name of the settlement was changed from Golobinjek to Golobinjek ob Sotli in 1953.

References

External links
Golobinjek ob Sotli on Geopedia

Populated places in the Municipality of Podčetrtek